John Barry Nuttall (born 11 January 1967) is a male British former long-distance runner who competed in track and cross country running. He competed for Great Britain at the 1996 Summer Olympics. He also represented his country twice at the World Championships in Athletics (1993, 1995) and five times at the IAAF World Cross Country Championships. He was a silver medallist at the 1994 IAAF World Cup and a bronze medallist at the 1994 Commonwealth Games.

Career
Born in Preston, Lancashire, he proved his ability for running as a teenager: he won the 3000 m at the English Schools' Athletics Championships in a championship record and placed third that same year at the 1985 European Athletics Junior Championships. Further international outings followed, with appearances at the 1986 IAAF World Cross Country Championships and the 1986 World Junior Championships in Athletics. He came close to a medal at the 1989 Summer Universiade, taking fourth place in the 5000 m.

He won a scholarship to study at Iowa State University and competed collegiately for the Iowa State Cyclones track and field and cross country teams. He suffered injuries in his first couple of years there but was successful later on. His greatest honour while there was a win at the 1989 NCAA Division I Cross Country Championships in which he and teammate Jonah Koech led a 1–2 for the Cyclones to win the NCAA team title. He won eight Big Eight Conference titles. He was also the 3000 m runner-up at the NCAA Indoor Championships in 1991. He was inducted into the school's hall of fame in 2001.

Nuttall's first senior international appearance came at the 1991 IAAF World Cross Country Championships, where he helped the English team to sixth. After a 3000 m win at the UK Athletics Championships in 1993, his first senior national title, he competed at the 1993 World Championships in Athletics, though he was eliminated in the heats. His most successful year came in 1994. He was Britain's top performer at the 1994 IAAF World Cross Country Championships in 32nd place then claimed fifth place in the 5000 m at the 1994 European Athletics Championships. He took his first major medals over the 5000 m, being the silver medallist at the 1994 IAAF World Cup (behind Brahim Lahlafi) and a bronze medallist at the 1994 Commonwealth Games. His last high-profile international medal was at the 1995 European Cup, where was runner-up for Britain in the 5000 m behind Italy's Gennaro Di Napoli.

Nuttal made his second a final outing at the World Championships in 1995, reaching the 5000 m final and coming 14th. He also ran at the Atlanta Olympics, but did not progress beyond the semi-finals. He had his highest career placing at the 1996 IAAF World Cross Country Championships in 28th to help a British team including Jon Brown, Rob Denmark, Andrew Pearson and Keith Cullen to fifth. That year he had double national success with wins at the English Cross Country Championships and the AAA Championships.

Reaching his thirties, Nuttall made his last high-profile appearance for Great Britain at the 1998 IAAF World Cross Country Championships, but he was lower down the order in 75th place. He continued to run on an informal basis in his late thirties: turning to road running, he completed the 2007 London Marathon in a time of 2:57:26 and finished the Great North Run in 82:32 minutes.

Personal life
He married fellow English distance runner Alison Wyeth. The couple later divorced and he married another British runner, Liz McColgan, becoming step-father to her daughter, athlete Eilish McColgan.

He has two children from his first marriage, Hannah Nuttall and Luke Nuttall. Hannah and Luke also became runners.

Personal bests
Mile run: 3:58.83 min (1991)
3000 metres: 7:36.40 min (1996)
5000 metres: 13:16.70 min (1995)
10,000 metres: 28:07.43 min (1995)

International competitions

National titles
UK Athletics Championships
3000 m: 1992
AAA Championships
5000 m: 1996
English Cross Country Championships
Long course: 1996
NCAA Men's Division I Cross Country Championship
Long course: 1989

See also
List of 5000 metres national champions (men)
England at the 1994 Commonwealth Games
Great Britain at the 1996 Summer Olympics

References

External links

1967 births
Living people
English male long-distance runners
Athletes (track and field) at the 1994 Commonwealth Games
Athletes (track and field) at the 1996 Summer Olympics
Commonwealth Games bronze medallists for England
Commonwealth Games medallists in athletics
Iowa State Cyclones men's track and field athletes
Olympic athletes of Great Britain
World Athletics Championships athletes for Great Britain
Sportspeople from Preston, Lancashire
Medallists at the 1994 Commonwealth Games